Md. Yunus Khan is a Bangladesh Nationalist Party politician and the former Member of Parliament of Barisal-6.

Career
Khan was elected to parliament from Barisal-6 as a Bangladesh Nationalist Party candidate in 1991.

References

Awami League politicians
5th Jatiya Sangsad members
Year of birth missing
1994 deaths